Oysters Rockefeller consists of oysters on the half-shell that have been topped with a rich sauce of butter, parsley and other green herbs, and bread crumbs, then baked or broiled. Lemon wedges are the typical garnish.

The original sauce may or may not include spinach, a popular shortcut for achieving the dish's signature bright green color. Many contemporary adaptations use diced oysters instead of whole. Also, diced bacon often appears as a non-traditional topping in addition to or in place of the sauce.

The dish appears as a popular restaurant appetizer throughout the United States and is served as a brunch item in the South.

History
Oysters Rockefeller was created in 1889 at the New Orleans restaurant Antoine's by Jules Alciatore, son of founder Antoine Alciatore. Jules developed the dish due to a shortage of escargot, substituting the locally available oysters. The restaurant's recipe remains unchanged, with an estimated three and a half million orders having been served by 1980.

 
The dish was named "oysters Rockefeller" after John D. Rockefeller, the then-wealthiest American, for its extreme richness. It consists of oysters on the half-shell topped with a green sauce and bread crumbs, then baked or broiled.
Though the original sauce recipe is a secret, it includes a purée of a number of green vegetables that may include spinach. Similar versions of the dish have proliferated in New Orleans, with none noted as an accurate duplicate.

Chef Alton Brown states in the "Shell Game" episode of his Food Network series Good Eats that Alciatore took his recipe to the grave and any version since is merely an assumption. While many achieve the sauce's trademark green color simply using spinach, Antoine's chefs have repeatedly denied the dish contains it. A 1986 laboratory analysis by William Poundstone in Bigger Secrets indicated its primary ingredients were parsley, pureed and strained celery, scallions or chives (indistinguishable in a food lab), olive oil, and capers.

Gallery

See also

 Cuisine of New Orleans
 List of seafood dishes

References

External links 
 

Cuisine of New Orleans
Louisiana cuisine
Oyster dishes
Baked foods
American seafood dishes